Nursery web spiders (Pisauridae) is a family of araneomorph spiders first described by Eugène Simon in 1890. They resemble wolf spiders (Lycosidae) except for several key differences. Wolf spiders have two very prominent eyes in addition to the other six, while a nursery web spider's eyes are all about the same size. Additionally, female nursery web spiders carry their egg sacs with their jaws and pedipalps instead of attaching them to their spinnerets as wolf spiders do. When the eggs are about to hatch, a female spider builds a nursery "tent", places her egg sac inside, and stands guard outside, hence the family's common name. Like the wolf spiders, however, the nursery web spiders are roaming hunters that don't use webs for catching prey.

Species occur throughout the world except for extremely dry or cold environments, and are common just about everywhere. Many can walk on the surface of still bodies of water and may even dive beneath the surface temporarily to escape enemies.

The name "nursery web spider" is especially given to the European species Pisaura mirabilis, but this family also includes fishing spiders and raft spiders.  Adult female specimens may reach up to 15mm in length, excluding legs.  The legs of the male are longer in relation to body size than those of the female.

The female spider sometimes attempts to eat the male after mating. The male, to reduce the risk of this, often presents the female with a gift such as a fly when approaching in the hope that this will satisfy her hunger. Sometimes, this gift is a fake present intended to fool the female. Males may wrap the fake gift in silk, to deceive the female to mate. Females can detect the fake gift and terminate mating, negating the male's deception in not giving a real gift.

Genera

, the World Spider Catalog accepts the following genera:

Afropisaura Blandin, 1976 — Africa
Archipirata Simon, 1898 — Turkmenistan, China
Architis Simon, 1898 — South America, Trinidad, Panama
Blandinia Tonini, Paulo da Silva, Serpa Filho & Freitas, 2016 — Madagascar
Bradystichus Simon, 1884 — New Caledonia
Caledomedes Raven & Hebron, 2018 — New Caledonia
Caripetella Strand, 1928 — Madagascar, Comoros
Charminus Thorell, 1899 — Africa
Chiasmopes Pavesi, 1883 — Ethiopia, Namibia, South Africa
Cispinilus Roewer, 1955 — Central Africa
Cispius Simon, 1898 — South Africa, Congo
Cladycnis Simon, 1898 — Canary Is.
Conakrya Schmidt, 1956 — Guinea
Dendrolycosa Doleschall, 1859 — Asia, Africa, Oceania
Dolomedes Latreille, 1804 — Africa, Oceania, South America, North America, Asia, Cuba
Eucamptopus Pocock, 1900 — India
Euprosthenops Pocock, 1897 — Africa, India
Euprosthenopsis Blandin, 1974 — Africa
Hala Jocqué, 1994 — Madagascar
Hygropoda Thorell, 1894 — Africa, Asia, Australia
Ilipula Simon, 1903 — Vietnam
Inola Davies, 1982 — Australia
Mangromedes Raven, 2018 — Australia
Maypacius Simon, 1898 — Africa
Megadolomedes Davies & Raven, 1980 — Australia
Nilus O. Pickard-Cambridge, 1876 — Asia, Africa
Ornodolomedes Raven & Hebron, 2018 — Australia
Papakula Strand, 1911 — Indonesia
Paracladycnis Blandin, 1979 — Madagascar
Perenethis L. Koch, 1878 — Asia, Comoros, Oceania
Phalaeops Roewer, 1955 — Mozambique, Djibouti
Pisaura Simon, 1886 — Asia
Pisaurina Simon, 1898 — United States, Canada, Cuba
Polyboea Thorell, 1895 — Asia
Qianlingula Zhang, Zhu & Song, 2004
Rothus Simon, 1898 — Israel, South Africa
Sphedanus Thorell, 1877 — Singapore, Malaysia, Indonesia
Stoliczka O. Pickard-Cambridge, 1885 — Pakistan
Tallonia Simon, 1889 — Madagascar
Tapinothele Simon, 1898 — Tanzania
Tapinothelella Strand, 1909 — South Africa
Tapinothelops Roewer, 1955 — Ethiopia
Tasmomedes Raven, 2018 — Australia
Tetragonophthalma Karsch, 1878 — 
Thalassiopsis Roewer, 1955 — Madagascar
Thaumasia Perty, 1833 — Central America, South America, Mexico
Tinus F. O. Pickard-Cambridge, 1901 — India, Cuba, North America, Central America
Tolma Jocqué, 1994 — Madagascar
Voraptipus Roewer, 1955 — Mozambique
Vuattouxia Blandin, 1979 — Côte d'Ivoire
Walrencea Blandin, 1979 — South Africa

Some fossilized spiders have also been assigned to this family:
 †Eopisaurella Petrunkevitch, 1958 (Early Eocene; Baltic amber)
 †Palaeoperenethis Seldon & Penney, 2009 (Ypresian, British Columbia, Canada)

Gallery

See also
 List of Pisauridae species

References